White Run  is a Pennsylvania stream which flows along the Gettysburg National Military Park (East Cavalry Field) and is an eponym of the Rock Creek-White Run hospital complex for field hospitals of the Battle of Gettysburg.  The run's mouth is at Rock Creek near the Trostle Farm along the Sachs Road, site of a hospital east of Round Top, Pennsylvania.

Tributaries 
Blocher's Run
Guinn Run
Plum Run
Spangler Spring Run
Stevens Run
Winebrenner Run

References

Rivers of Adams County, Pennsylvania
Rivers of Pennsylvania
Tributaries of the Monocacy River